Sena is a district (amphoe) in Phra Nakhon Si Ayutthaya province, central Thailand. Local people typically know the populated centre of Sena as Ban Phaen.

Geography
Neighboring districts are (from the north clockwise) Phak Hai, Bang Ban, Bang Sai, Lat Bua Luang and Bang Sai of Ayutthaya Province.

Administration
The district is divided into 17 sub-districts (tambon), which are further subdivided into 132 administrative villages (muban). Sena is a town covering the whole Sena sub-district. There are four sub-district municipalities (thesaban tambon) − Sam Ko and Bang Nom Kho cover the whole same-named sub-district, Hua Wiang the whole sub-district Hua Wiang and Ban Krathum, and Chao Chet the whole sub-district Chao Sadet and parts of the sub-district Chao Chet and Ban Thaeo. There are a further nine tambon administrative organizations as the local government for the sub-districts not part of a municipality.

References

Sena